Small house may refer to:
 Small house (Zimbabwe), an expression meaning an extramarital affair
 Small house movement, the trend towards downsizing to a low-cost, small house

See also
 Small House (disambiguation)